Dr. John T. James is the Chief Toxicologist for the National Aeronautics & Space Administration. He leads the Space Toxicology Office located at Lyndon B. Johnson Space Center in Houston, Texas.

Education 

Dr. James received his BA in Physics, Mathematics and Astronomy from the University of Kansas in 1968. He earned an MA in Astronomy from the University of Virginia in 1970, an MS in Chemistry from the University of Maryland College Park in 1977, and a PhD in Pathology from the Graduate School of the University of Maryland School of Medicine in Baltimore in 1982. His doctoral thesis was entitled The DNA Adducts and Neoplastic Changes Produced in the Large Intestine of ICR/Ha and CSTBI/Ha Mice by 1,2-Dimethylhydrazine.

In 1986 James became a Diplomate of the American Board of Toxicology (DABT).

NASA career 

James is the chief scientist of space toxicology at Johnson Space Center in Houston, Texas. He joined the NASA team in 1989. He is responsible for the quality of air in spacecraft that carry humans, including the Space Shuttle and the International Space Station. He leads a team of experts who set air quality and water quality standards for spacecraft and verify compliance with those standards through environmental monitoring. His team also controls the toxicological risk posed by any chemical or compound that could enter a human-rated spacecraft. His current research interests focus on the assessment of the toxicity of lunar dust and developing a hand-held monitor for volatile organic compounds present in spacecraft air. He has received letters of commendation, sustained superior performance awards, the Shuttle Star award, the NASA exceptional service medal, and most recently NASA's Silver Snoopy Award from the astronaut corps, for his work and dedication to the health and safety of crewmembers.

Scientific Expertise 

Dr. James served as an inhalation toxicologist for the U.S. Army at the Chemical Research Development and Engineering Center in Aberdeen Proving Ground, MD from 1982 to 1989. There he was responsible for projects on multispecies inhalation toxicity to achieve accurate human estimates on chemical warfare agents.  From 1978 to 1981 he served as a guest investigator at the National Cancer Institute in Bethesda, MD where he discovered a relationship between chemically induced colon tumors in two strains of mice and the persistence of miscoding DNA adducts in colonic mucosa. He is the inventor of three research devices including a gas mask filter test apparatus and a charcoal adsorbent test apparatus.

His current research interests focus on the toxic effects of inhaled dusts to include carbon nanotubes, which are useful in making high-strength and light-weight materials, and lunar dust, which could be a health problem when we return to the moon for good. He and his team are developing differential mobility spectrometry for applications to spacecraft air quality monitoring.

Patient Safety 

Dr. James' personal activities center on patient safety advocacy, which developed as a result of loss of his 19-year-old son to medical errors. He has spoken to civic, religious, political, legislative, and expert groups on ways to improve patient safety. He is the recipient of the Semmelweis Society award for patient safety advocacy and was a 2008 Patient and Family Scholar to the National Patient Safety Foundation meeting. Dr. James is author of "A Sea of Broken Hearts" published in 2007; he founded Patient Safety America in 2008 (http://PatientSafetyAmerica.com/) and distributes a monthly newsletter on patient safety to hundreds of members. His newsletter is designed to inform the public of new scientific discoveries published in major medical journals that could affect their safety when they seek healthcare. Members of Patient Safety America are encouraged and guided to support national legislation that fosters patient safety in America.

Personal 
James married the former Donna Breniser of Ligonier, PA in 1976 and they have had three children: John Alexander in 1982, Laura Katherine in 1984, and Austen David in 1991. He is active in Clear Lake United Methodist Church and the Bay Area Emmaus Community, giving special attention to youth development.

Inventions 

 James JT.  Research Apparatus.  United States Statutory Invention Registration No. H145, October 7, 1986
 James JT, Buettner LC, Genovese JA.  Gas Mask Filter Test Apparatus.  U.S. Patent No. 4,622,852, November 18, 1986
 Genovese JA, James JT, Buettner LC.  Charcoal Adsorbent Test Apparatus and Method Using Filter Tubes.  United States Statutory Invention Registration No. H255, April 7, 1987

Selected Papers

References

Sources
 NASA.gov
 
 http://iom.edu/Object.File/Master/61/240/James%20BIO.pdf
 NASA.gov
 
 
 https://www.amazon.com/Sea-Broken-Hearts-Dangerous-Profit-Driven/dp/1434321363

Year of birth missing (living people)
Living people
People from Memphis, Tennessee
University of Kansas alumni
People from Wichita, Kansas
University of Virginia alumni
University of Maryland, College Park alumni
University of Maryland School of Medicine alumni
NASA people
People from Houston
American scientists